Schistura sombooni is a species of ray-finned fish, a stone loach, in the genus Schistura. It is found only in the Mekong drainage system in Laos where it occurs in stretches of streams with a relatively slow current and a gravel or sandy stream bed. The specific name honours Somboon Phetphommasouk a liaison engineer with the Nam Theun 2 Electricity Consortium of Vientiane who rendered assistance and help in the field to the describer of this species, Maurice Kottelat.

References

S
Taxa named by Maurice Kottelat
Fish described in 1998